The Wensleydale railway line was a railway branch line in Victoria, Australia. It ran for approximately 18 km from the Port Fairy railway line near Moriac, to Wensleydale, Victoria. It was opened in March 1890 and was used to transport firewood, gravel and brown coal out of the area. Apart from troop trains during World War II the line saw very little traffic and was closed in 1948.

Line guide

References

Further reading

Closed regional railway lines in Victoria (Australia)
Railway lines opened in 1892
Railway lines closed in 1947
Transport in Barwon South West (region)